OpenStreetMap (OSM) is a free, open geographic database updated and maintained by a community of volunteers via open collaboration. Contributors collect data from surveys, trace from aerial imagery and also import from other freely licensed geodata sources. OpenStreetMap is freely licensed under the Open Database License and as a result commonly used to make electronic maps, inform turn-by-turn navigation, assist in humanitarian aid and data visualisation. OpenStreetMap uses its own topology to store geographical features which can then be exported into other GIS file formats. The OpenStreetMap website itself is an online map, geodata search engine and editor.

In 2004, OpenStreetMap was created by Steve Coast in response to the Ordnance Survey, the United Kingdom's national mapping agency, failing to release its data to the public and under free licences. Initially, maps were created only via GPS traces, but it was quickly populated by importing public domain geographical data such as the U.S. TIGER and tracing permitted aerial photography. OpenStreetMap's adoption was accelerated by Google Maps's introduction of pricing in 2012 and the development of supporting software and applications. The database is hosted by the OpenStreetMap Foundation, a non-profit organisation registered in England and Wales and is funded mostly via donations.

History 

Steve Coast founded the project in 2004 while at university in Britain, initially focusing on mapping the United Kingdom.  In the UK and elsewhere, government-run and tax-funded projects like the Ordnance Survey created massive datasets but declined to freely and widely distribute them.  The first contribution was made in the city of London in 2005.

In April 2006, the OpenStreetMap Foundation was established to encourage the growth, development and distribution of free geospatial data and provide geospatial data for anybody to use and share. In December 2006, Yahoo! confirmed that OpenStreetMap could use its aerial photography as a backdrop for map production.

In April 2007, Automotive Navigation Data (AND) donated a complete road data set for the Netherlands and trunk road data for India and China to the project and by July 2007, when the first OpenStreetMap international The State of the Map conference was held, there were 9,000 registered users. Sponsors of the event included Google, Yahoo! and Multimap. In October 2007, OpenStreetMap completed the import of a US Census TIGER road dataset. In December 2007, Oxford University became the first major organisation to use OpenStreetMap data on their main website.

Ways to import and export data have continued to grow – by 2008, the project developed tools to export OpenStreetMap data to power portable GPS units, replacing their existing proprietary and out-of-date maps. In March, two founders of CloudMade, a commercial company that uses OpenStreetMap data, announced that they had received venture capital funding of €2.4million. In November 2010, Bing changed their licence to allow use of their satellite imagery for making maps.

In 2012, the launch of pricing for Google Maps led several prominent websites to switch from their service to OpenStreetMap and other competitors. Chief among these were Foursquare and Craigslist, which adopted OpenStreetMap, and Apple, which ended a contract with Google and launched a self-built mapping platform using TomTom and OpenStreetMap data.

In 2017, DigitalGlobe started providing satellite imagery to aid OpenStreetMap contributions.

In June 2021, OpenStreetMap Foundation announced plans to move from the United Kingdom to a country in the European Union, citing Brexit as the inciting factor. According to the organisation, there are several reasons for the move, including "the failure of the UK and EU to agree on mutual recognition of database rights", the rising difficulties in "banking, finance and using PayPal in the UK" and the loss of .eu domains.

In mid-December 2022, the Linux Foundation announced the launch of a new mapping collaboration, the Overture Maps Foundation. Its stated mission is "powering current and next-generation map products by creating reliable, easy-to-use, and interoperable open map data." Overture founding members were Amazon Web Services (AWS), Meta, Microsoft and TomTom. Overture is to be complementary to OpenStreetMap and Overture encourages members to contribute data directly to OpenStreetMap.

Data structure 

OpenStreetMap uses a topological data structure, with four core elements (also known as data primitives):
 Nodes are points with a geographic position, stored as coordinates (pairs of a latitude and a longitude) according to WGS 84. Outside of their usage in ways, they are used to represent map features without a size, such as points of interest or mountain peaks.
 Ways are ordered lists of nodes, representing a polyline, or possibly a polygon if they form a closed loop. They are used both for representing linear features such as streets and rivers, and areas, like forests, parks, parking areas and lakes.
 Relations are ordered lists of nodes, ways and relations (together called "members"), where each member can optionally have a "role" (a string). Relations are used for representing the relationship of existing nodes and ways. Examples include turn restrictions on roads, routes that span several existing ways (for instance, a long-distance motorway), and areas with holes.
 Tags are key-value pairs (both arbitrary strings). They are used to store metadata about the map objects (such as their type, their name and their physical properties). Tags are not freestanding, but are always attached to an object: to a node, a way or a relation. A recommended ontology of map features (the meaning of tags) is maintained on a wiki. New tagging schemes can always be proposed by a popular vote of a written proposal in OpenStreetMap wiki, however, there is no requirement to follow this process. There are over 89 million different kinds of tags in use as of June 2017.
The OpenStreetMap data primitives are stored and processed in different formats.

The main copy of the OpenStreetMap data is stored in OpenStreetMap's main database. The main database is a PostgreSQL database, which has one table for each data primitive, with individual objects stored as rows. All edits happen in this database, and all other formats are created from it. Data from GeoNames is used for the search in OpenStreetMap.

For data transfer, several database dumps are created, which are available for download. The complete dump is called planet.osm. These dumps exist in two formats, one using XML and one using the Protocol Buffer Binary Format (PBF).

Data collection

Map data is collected from scratch by volunteers performing systematic ground surveys using tools such as a handheld GPS unit, a notebook, digital camera, or a voice recorder. The data is then entered into the OpenStreetMap database using a number of software tools including JOSM and Merkaator. Mapathon competition events are also held by OpenStreetMap team and by non-profit organisations and local governments to map a particular area.

The availability of aerial photography and other data from commercial and government sources has added important sources of data for manual editing and automated imports. Special processes are in place to handle automated imports and avoid legal and technical problems. OpenStreetMap data has been favourably compared with proprietary datasources, although  data quality varied across the world.

Software

Editing of maps can be done using the default web browser editor called iD, an HTML5 application using D3.js and written by Mapbox, which was originally financed by the Knight Foundation. JOSM, Potlatch, and Merkaartor are more powerful desktop editing applications that are better suited for advanced users.

Vespucci is the primary full-featured editor for Android; it has been regularly released since 2009.  StreetComplete is an Android app launched in 2016, which allows users without any OpenStreetMap knowledge to answer simple questions for existing data in OpenStreetMap, and thus contribute data. Maps.me and OsmAnd, two offline mobile map applications available for Android and iOS, both include limited OpenStreetMap data editors. Go Map!! is an iOS app that lets users create and edit information in OpenStreetMap. Pushpin is another iOS app that lets users add POI on the go.

Surveys and personal knowledge

Ground surveys are performed by a mapper, on foot, bicycle, or in a car, motorcycle, or boat. Map data was typically recorded on a GPS unit. In late 2006  Yahoo! made their aerial imagery available for tracing to OpenStreetMap contributors, which simplified mapping of readily visible and identifiable features. The project still makes use of GPS traces from volunteers which are used to delineate the more difficult to identify and classify features such as footpath, as well as providing ground-truth for aerial imagery alignment.

Once the data has been collected, it is entered into the database by uploading it onto the project's website together with appropriate attribute data. As collecting and uploading data may be separated from editing objects, contribution to the project is possible without using a GPS unit.

Some committed contributors adopt the task of mapping whole towns and cities, or organising mapping parties to gather the support of others to complete a map area. A large number of less active users contribute corrections and small additions to the map.

Street-level image data 
In addition to several different sets of satellite image backgrounds available to OpenStreetMap editors, data from several street-level image platforms are available as map data photo overlays: Bing Streetside 360° image tracks, and the open and crowdsourced Mapillary and KartaView platforms, generally smartphone and other windshield-mounted camera images. Additionally, a Mapillary traffic sign data layer can be enabled; it is the product of user-submitted images.

Government data
Some government agencies have released official data on appropriate licences. This includes the United States, where works of the federal government are placed under public domain.

Globally, OpenStreetMap initially used the Prototype Global Shoreline from NOAA. Due to it being oversimplified and crude, it has been mainly replaced by other government sources or manual tracing.

In the United States, most roads originate from TIGER from the Census Bureau. Geographic names were initially sourced from Geographic Names Information System, and some areas contain water features from the National Hydrography Dataset. In the UK, some Ordnance Survey OpenData is imported. In Canada Natural Resources Canada's CanVec vector data and GeoBase provide landcover and streets.

Out-of-copyright maps can be good sources of information about features that do not change frequently. Copyright periods vary, but in the UK Crown copyright expires after 50 years and hence Ordnance Survey maps until the 1960s can legally be used. A complete set of UK 1 inch/mile maps from the late 1940s and early 1950s has been collected, scanned, and is available online as a resource for contributors.

Contributors 

The project has a geographically diverse user-base, due to emphasis of local knowledge and "on-the-ground" situation in the process of data collection. Many early contributors were cyclists who survey with and for bicyclists, charting cycleroutes and navigable trails. Others are GIS professionals who contribute data with an extension for ArcGIS. Contributors are predominately men, with only 3–5% being women.

By August 2008, shortly after the second The State of the Map conference was held, there were over 50,000 registered contributors; by March 2009, there were 100,000 and by the end of 2009 the figure was nearly 200,000. In April 2012, OpenStreetMap cleared 600,000 registered contributors. On 6 January 2013, OpenStreetMap reached one million registered users. Around 30% of users have contributed at least one point to the OpenStreetMap database.

Since 2007, the OpenStreetMap community has held an annual, international conference called State of the Map. There are also various national, regional and continental SotM conferences, such as SotM U.S., SotM Baltics, SotM Asia & SotM Africa.

Commercial contributors 
Some OpenStreetMap data is supplied by companies that choose to freely license either actual street data or satellite imagery sources from which OpenStreetMap contributors can trace roads and features.

Notably, Automotive Navigation Data provided a complete road data set for Netherlands and details of trunk roads in China and India. In December 2006, Yahoo! confirmed that OpenStreetMap was able to make use of their vertical aerial imagery and this photography was available within the editing software as an overlay. Contributors could create their vector based maps as a derived work, released with a free and open licence, until the shutdown of the Yahoo! Maps API on 13 September 2011. In November 2010, Microsoft announced that the OpenStreetMap community could use Bing vertical aerial imagery as a backdrop in its editors. For a period from 2009 to 2011, NearMap Pty Ltd made their high-resolution PhotoMaps (of major Australian cities, plus some rural Australian areas) available for deriving OpenStreetMap data under a CC BY-SA licence.

In June 2018, the Microsoft Bing team announced a major contribution of 125 million U.S. building footprints to the project – four times the number contributed by users and government data imports.

Sister projects 
Several open collaborative mapping projects integrate with the OpenStreetMap database or are otherwise affiliated with the OpenStreetMap project:

 OpenHistoricalMap is a world historical map based on the OpenStreetMap software platform.
 OpenRailwayMap is a detailed online map of the world's railway infrastructure, built on OpenStreetMap data. It has been available since mid-2013 at openrailwaymap.org.
 OpenSeaMap is a world nautical chart built as a mashup of OpenStreetMap, crowdsourced water depth tracks, and third-party weather and bathymetric data.
 Wheelmap.org is a portal for mapping, browsing, and reviewing wheelchair-accessible places.

Usage

World map

Web browser
Data provided by the OpenStreetMap project can be viewed in a web browser with JavaScript support on its official website. The basic map views offered are: Standard, Cycle map, Transport map and Humanitarian. Map display and category options are available using OpenStreetBrowser.
OsmAnd
OsmAnd is free software for Android and iOS mobile devices that can use offline vector data from OpenStreetMap. It also supports layering OpenStreetMap vector data with prerendered raster map tiles from OpenStreetMap and other sources.
Locus Map
Locus Map is both free software and premium for Android mobile devices that can use offline vector data from OpenStreetMap. It also supports layering OpenStreetMap vector data with prerendered raster map tiles from OpenStreetMap and other sources.
Maps.me
Maps.me is free software for Android and iOS mobile devices that provides offline maps based on OpenStreetMap data.
Organic Maps
Organic Maps is a mobile map and navigation app with a focus on privacy. It is free software for Android and iOS mobile devices, and provides offline maps based on OpenStreetMap data.
GNOME Maps
GNOME Maps is a graphical front-end written in JavaScript and introduced in GNOME 3.10. It provides a mechanism to find the user's location with the help of GeoClue, finds directions via GraphHopper and it can deliver a list as answer to queries.
Marble
Marble is a KDE virtual globe application which received support for OpenStreetMap.
Virtlo
Virtlo is a AR based free mobile application for iOS and Android which show's OpenStreetMap data through Augmented Reality.
FoxtrotGPS
FoxtrotGPS is a GTK+-based map viewer, that is especially suited to touch input. It is available in the SHR or Debian repositories.

The web site OpenStreetMap.org provides a slippy map interface based on the Leaflet JavaScript library (and formerly built on OpenLayers), displaying map tiles rendered by the Mapnik rendering engine, and tiles from other sources including OpenCycleMap.org.

Custom maps can also be generated from OpenStreetMap data through various software including Jawg Maps, Mapnik, Mapbox Studio, Mapzen's Tangrams.

OpenStreetMap maintains lists of online and offline routing engines available, such as the Open Source Routing Machine. OpenStreetMap data is popular with routing researchers, and is also available to open-source projects and companies to build routing applications (or for any other purpose).

Humanitarian aid

The 2010 Haiti earthquake has established a model for non-governmental organisations (NGOs) to collaborate with international organisations. OpenStreetMap and Crisis Commons volunteers using available satellite imagery to map the roads, buildings and refugee camps of Port-au-Prince in just two days, building "the most complete digital map of Haiti's roads".

The resulting data and maps have been used by several organisations providing relief aid, such as the World Bank, the European Commission Joint Research Centre, the Office for the Coordination of Humanitarian Affairs, UNOSAT and others.

NGOs, like the Humanitarian OpenStreetMap Team and others, have worked with donors like United States Agency for International Development (USAID) to map other parts of Haiti and parts of many other countries, both to create map data for places that were blank, and to engage and build capacity of local people.

After Haiti, the OpenStreetMap community continued mapping to support humanitarian organisations for various crises and disasters. After the Northern Mali conflict (January 2013), Typhoon Haiyan in the Philippines (November 2013), and the Ebola virus epidemic in West Africa (March 2014), the OpenStreetMap community has shown it can play a significant role in supporting humanitarian organisations.

The Humanitarian OpenStreetMap Team acts as an interface between the OpenStreetMap community and the humanitarian organisations.

Along with post-disaster work, the Humanitarian OpenStreetMap Team has worked to build better risk models and grow the local OpenStreetMap communities in multiple countries including Uganda, Senegal, the Democratic Republic of the Congo in partnership with the Red Cross, Médecins Sans Frontières, World Bank, and other humanitarian groups.

Scientific research

OpenStreetMap data was used in scientific studies. For example, road data was used for research of remaining roadless areas and in the creation of the annual Forest Landscape Integrity Index.

Route planning
In February 2015, OpenStreetMap added route planning functionality to the map on its official website. The routing uses external services, namely OSRM, GraphHopper and MapQuest.

Downstream users 

A variety of popular services incorporate some sort of geolocation or map-based component. Notable services using OpenStreetMap for this include:

 Amazon uses OpenStreetMap for navigation and has a team who revises the map based on feedback from drivers.
OpenStreetMap is one of the many cited sources for Apple's custom maps in iOS 6, though the majority of map data is provided by TomTom. As of February 2021, Apple was the most prolific corporate editor, responsible for 80% of edits to existing roads.
 Ballardia (games developer) launched World of the Living Dead: Resurrection in October 2013, which has incorporated OpenStreetMap into its game engine, along with census information, to create a browser-based game mapping over 14,000 square kilometres of greater Los Angeles and survival strategy gameplay. Its previous incarnation had used Google Maps, which had proven incapable of supporting high volumes of players, so during 2013 they shut down the Google Maps version and ported the game to OpenStreetMap.
 Craigslist switched to OpenStreetMap in 2012, rendering their own tiles based on the data.
 Facebook uses the map directly in its website/mobile app (depending on the zoom level, the area and the device), with a rendering style designed by Stamen Design as of 2021. Facebook has also used AI technology to detect roads absent from OpenStreetMap but visible in aerial imagery ("mapwith.ai" / "Map with AI"), and has developed an OpenStreetMap editing tool ("RapiD") for adding these roads to OpenStreetMap. The "Daylight Map Distribution" is a snapshot of OpenStreetMap data created by Facebook that claims to be clean of vandalism.
 Flickr uses OpenStreetMap data for various cities around the world, including Baghdad, Beijing, Kabul, Santiago, Sydney and Tokyo. In 2012, the maps switched to use Nokia data primarily, with OpenStreetMap being used in areas where the commercial provider lacked performance.
 Foursquare started using OpenStreetMap via Mapbox's rendering and infrastructure of OpenStreetMap.
 Garmin uses OpenStreetMap data for some maps for GPSs units.
 Geotab uses OpenStreetMap data in their Vehicle Tracking Software platform, MyGeotab.
 Hasbro, the toy company behind the real estate-themed board game Monopoly, launched Monopoly City Streets, a massively multiplayer online game (MMORPG) which allowed players to "buy" streets all over the world. The game used map tiles from Google Maps and the Google Maps API to display the game board, but the underlying street data was obtained from OpenStreetMap. The online game was a limited time offering, its servers were shut down in the end of January 2010.
 Komoot, a route planning service for running, cycling and hiking uses OpenStreetMap data
 Mapbox, a provider of custom online maps for websites and applications
 MapQuest announced a service based on OpenStreetMap in 2010, which eventually became MapQuest Open.
 Mapy.cz is based on OpenStreetMap and extends it by allowing users to upload photos, by making web searches by categories like travel tips, restaurant, accommodation, and by featuring 3D views, areal views, historical photos and haptic mode for blind people. It has apps for both Android and iOS with offline maps.
 Moovit uses maps based on OpenStreetMap in their free mobile application for public transit navigation.
 Niantic switched to OpenStreetMap based maps from Google Maps on 1 December 2017 for their games Ingress and Pokémon Go.
Nominatim (from the Latin, 'by name') is a tool to search OpenStreetMap data by name and address (geocoding) and then to generate synthetic addresses of OpenStreetMap points (reverse geocoding).
 OpenTopoMap renders topographic maps based on OpenStreetMap data and on SRTM data.
 Petal Maps is a free mobile map application developed by Huawei. From its copyright statement, OpenStreetMap is one of their map data sources.
 Snapchat's June 2017 update introduced its Snap Map with data from Mapbox, OpenStreetMap, and DigitalGlobe.
 Strava switched to OpenStreetMap rendered and hosted by Mapbox from Google Maps in July 2015.
 Tableau has integrated OpenStreetMap for all their mapping needs. It has been integrated in all of their products.
 TCDD Taşımacılık uses OpenStreetMap as a location map on passenger seats on YHTs.
 Tesla Smart Summon feature released widely in US in October 2019 uses OSM data to navigate vehicles in private parking areas autonomously (without a safety driver)
 Wahoo uses OpenStreetMap for mapping and giving turn-by-turn navigation in their ELEMNT cycling computers.
 Webots uses OpenStreetMap data to create a virtual environment for autonomous vehicle simulations.
 Gurtam uses OpenStreetMap data in their GPS Tracking Software platform, Wialon.
 Wikimedia projects uses OpenStreetMap as a locator map for cities and travel points of interest.
 Wikipedia uses OpenStreetMap data to render custom maps used by the articles. Many languages are included in the WIWOSM project (Wikipedia Where in OpenStreetMap) which aims to show OpenStreetMap objects on a slippy map, directly visible on the article page.

Licensing terms 
OpenStreetMap data was originally published under the Creative Commons Attribution-ShareAlike licence (CC BY-SA) with the intention of promoting free use and redistribution of the data. In September 2012, the licence was changed to the Open Database Licence (ODbL) published by Open Data Commons (ODC) in order to more specifically define its bearing on data rather than representation.

As part of this relicensing process, some of the map data was removed from the public distribution. This included all data contributed by members that did not agree to the new licensing terms, as well as all subsequent edits to those affected objects. It also included any data contributed based on input data that was not compatible with the new terms. Estimates suggested that over 97% of data would be retained globally, but certain regions would be affected more than others, such as in Australia where 24 to 84% of objects would be retained, depending on the type of object. Ultimately, more than 99% of the data was retained, with Australia and Poland being the countries most severely affected by the change.

All data added to the project needs to have a licence compatible with the Open Database Licence. This can include out-of-copyright information, public domain or other licences. Contributors agree to a set of terms which require compatibility with the current licence. This may involve examining licences for government data to establish whether it is compatible. Software used in the production and presentation of OpenStreetMap data is available from many different projects and each may have its own licensing. 

OpenStreetMap uses "Ruby on Rails" to enable users to edit maps and view changelogs. The application also uses PostgreSQL for storage of user data and edit metadata. The default map is rendered by Mapnik, stored in PostGIS, and powered by an Apache module called mod_tile. Certain parts of the software, such as the map editor Potlatch2, have been made available as public domain.

See also

 
 
 
 
 
 
 
 Other collaborative mapping projects
 
 
 
 
 
 Smartphone applications

References

Further reading

External links

 

 
2004 establishments in the United Kingdom
British websites
Internet properties established in 2004
Wikis about geography
Social information processing
Open data
Web mapping